Male is the fifth studio album by Australian-British singer Natalie Imbruglia, released by Portrait on 31 July 2015. It was released in Europe on 21 August 2015.

Male is Imbruglia's first album in six years and features the singer covering tracks made famous by male-led acts, hence the album's title.

Critical reception

Male received generally positive reviews from music critics. At Metacritic, which assigns a normalised rating out of 100 to reviews from mainstream critics, the album received an average score of 65, which indicates "generally favorable reviews", based on four reviews by critics.

Tour
On 7 February 2017, Imbruglia announced that she would embark on the 2017 Acoustic Tour in support of the album, which took place from April to May 2017.

Track listing

Charts

Release history

See also
 Strange Little Girls, a 2001 album by Tori Amos with a similar concept

References

2015 albums
Covers albums
Natalie Imbruglia albums
Concept albums